Varela is a Spanish and Portuguese surname of Galician origin. Notable people with the surname include:
Abigail Varela (born 1948), Venezuelan artist
Adílio Varela (born 1996), Portuguese footballer
Adilson Tavares Varela (born 1988), footballer
Adrián Varela (born 1984), Mexican reality show contestant
Adriana Varela (born 1952), Argentine tango singer
Alan Varela (born 2001), Argentine footballer
Alberto Varela (born 1940), Uruguayan fencer
Alejandro Varela (born 1979), Spanish footballer
Alfredo Varela (disambiguation), several people
Amancio (footballer), full name Amancio Amaro Varela (born 1939), Spanish footballer
Ângelo Varela (born 1980), Portuguese footballer
Antonio María Rouco Varela (born 1936), Spanish Catholic cardinal
Armando Varela (born 1997), East Timorese footballer
Benjamin Varela (born 1955), Puerto Rican wrestler
Blanca Varela (1926–2009), Peruvian poet
Brianna Varela, see List of Survivor (American TV series) contestants
Bruno Varela (born 1994), Portuguese footballer
Carlos Varela (disambiguation), several people
Conny Varela (born 1954), Puerto Rican politician
Cristopher Varela (born 1999), Venezuelan footballer
Cybèle Varela (born 1943), Brazilian artist
Daniel Varela Suanzes-Carpegna (born 1951), Spanish politician
Daniela Varela, Portuguese singer and songwriter
Edgar Varela (baseball) (born 1980), American baseball player and coach
Eduardo Varela, Mexican journalist
Enrique Bermúdez Varela (1932–1991), Nicaraguan soldier and rebel
Erika Varela (born 1994), Mexican cyclist
Euclides Varela (born 1982),  Cape Verdean long-distance runner
Fagundes Varela (1841–1875), Brazilian poet
Federico Varela (born 1996), Argentine footballer
Felipe Varela, Spanish fashion designer
Félix Varela (1788–1853), Cuban and United States venerated Catholic priest
Fernando Varela (disambiguation), several people
Florencio Varela (writer) (1808–1848), Argentine writer, poet, journalist and educator
Francisco Varela (disambiguation), several people
Froilán Varela (1891–1948), Uruguayan actor
Gerardo Varela (born 1963), Chilean lawyer and politician
Gilson Varela (born 1990), Cape Verdean footballer
Guillermo Varela (born 1993), Uruguayan footballer
Gustavo Varela (born 1978), Uruguayan footballer
Héctor Varela (disambiguation), several people
Hugo Varela (born 1992), Spanish squash player
Iris Varela (born 1969), Venezuelan lawyer and politician
Jairo Varela (1949–2012), Colombian musician in Grupo Niche
Javier Varela (born 1940), Mexican field hockey player
Jazmín Beccar Varela (born 1986), Argentinian actress
Jesus Varela (1927–2018), Filipino Catholic bishop
Jhonata Varela (born 2000), Brazilian footballer
João Varela (disambiguation), several people
Joaquín Varela (disambiguation), several people
John Varela (born 1987), Colombian footballer
Jorge Varela (disambiguation), several people
José Varela (disambiguation), several people
Juan Carlos Varela (born 1963), President of Panama
Julia Varela (born 1981), Spanish radio and television journalist
Leonor Varela (born 1972), Chilean actress
Lorenzo Varela (1917–1978), Spanish poet
Luciano Varela, Spanish judge
Lucky Varela (1935–2017), American politician
Luis Varela (disambiguation), several people
Manuel Varela (disambiguation), several people
Maria Varela (born 1940), Mexican-American civil rights organizer and author
Marquesa de Varela, Uruguayan media executive specialising in celebrity interviews
Marta Varela (born 1943), Argentine composer, pianist, and teacher
Matias Varela (born 1980), Swedish actor
Mauro Varela (1941–2020), Spanish banker, lawyer and politician
Migdia Chinea Varela, American actress
Miguel Varela (–2016), Filipino businessman and lawyer
Nico Varela (born 1991), Uruguayan footballer
Nilton Varela (born 2001), Portuguese footballer
Obdulio Varela (1917–1996), Uruguayan footballer
Omar Varela (born 1957), Uruguayan actor, theatre director and playwright
Pany Varela, full name Anilton César Varela da Silva (born 1989), futsal player
Pedro Varela (1837–1906), president of Uruguay in 1868 and from 1875 to 1876
Reinaldo Varela (born 1959), Brazilian four-wheeler motorcycle rider
Rui Varela (born 1983), Portuguese footballer
Severino Varela (1913–1995), Uruguayan footballer
Silvestre Varela (born 1985), Portuguese footballer
Sofía Varela (born 1998), Costa Rican footballer
Tanza Varela (born 1991), Chilean actress and model
Tilsia Varela (born 1994), Venezuelan chess player
Toni Varela (born 1986), Cape Verdean footballer
Tomás Varela (born 1948), Cuban hockey player
Víctor Varela (born 1955), Swedish composer
Vitalina Varela (actress) (born 1966), Cape Verdean actress
Wilber Varela (1958–2008), Colombian drug lord
Yan Bartelemí, full name Yan Bartelemí Varela (born 1980), Cuban boxer
Yolanda Varela (1930–2009), Mexican actress

Portuguese-language surnames
Galician-language surnames